Ad Fundum is a 1993 Belgian drama film directed by Erik Van Looy. It is his first feature-length film after the short films Dr. Tritsmans and Yuppies. It tells the story of some students studying at the university of Leuven who participate in some initiation rites.

Plot
Sammy, Dennis, and Tom are 18 years old and enrolled as students at the university in Leuven. They rent some rooms in a fraternity house. As first-year students they decide to join a student association and have a hazing. They become freshman and "sell" themselves to do some tasks. The shy Sammy is giving the task to bring a jar of his own semen to the initiation ceremony. As he rejects, he is set on a "flying carpet". Whilst Sammy is in the air, chairman Guy Bogaerts orders the students to withdraw the carpet. Sammy falls on the ground, breaks his vertebra and dies immediately.

The police starts an investigation: the students won't talk, the students' union claims Sammy died due to alcohol abuse and the university declares not to be responsible for fraternities.

Dennis and Tom start their own investigation. They find a man who was fraternized some years earlier also under command of Guy Bogaerts. He was also set on the flying carpet which was suddenly removed. He broke his leg and walks with a limp since then. The case "Sammy" is set to court, but the judge opines there is not enough proof so Guy is set free.

Dennis and Tom want revenge and challenge Guy to steal the town's flag. Guy climbs the town hall and takes the flag. However, an unknown person opens the window. Guy falls down and is considered to be dead.

Title 
"Ad Fundum" (Latin for "to the bottom") is a term used among students for drinking an entire glass of beer at one time.

References

External links 
 

Belgian teen drama films
1990s teen drama films
1993 drama films
1993 films
Films directed by Erik Van Looy
1990s Dutch-language films
Films shot in Antwerp
Films set in Antwerp
Films set in Flanders
Films set in Belgium
Films about fraternities and sororities
Dutch-language Belgian films